Giorgi Vepkhvadze is a Georgian rugby union player. He plays as Prop for Oyonnax in Top 14.

Notes

1991 births
Living people
Rugby union players from Georgia (country)
Rugby union props